Jeevan Yudh is a 1997 Indian Hindi-language film directed by Partho Ghosh, produced by Piyush Chakravorthy, starring Mithun Chakraborty, Raakhee, Jaya Prada, Atul Agnihotri, Mamta Kulkarni, Shakti Kapoor, Rami Reddy and Alok Nath. The film also had a Bengali version release under the title Jiban Juddha.

Plot

Vasudev Rai lives in a small town with his wife and son, Rohit. Vasudev works as a teacher in a school owned and operated by Gajraj Choudhry. One day, a truck driver named Deva Prakash brings the body of Vasudev to a nearby hospital, and requests the doctor to treat him. The doctor determines that Vasudev is dead, summons the police, and asks Deva to wait until their arrival for his statement. When Deva disappears, he is assumed to be responsible for Vasudev's death. Vasudev's wife and son are devastated. Rohit swears to avenge his father's death and leaves the town. His investigation lets him conclude that the murderer is somewhere near his home town and he returns to find that his town now has a new police in-Charge, Inspector Ajay Kumar. Rohit suspects that Ajay is not who he claims to be and starts making inquiries and unmasks that Ajay is Deva. Accused of killing Vasudev, Deva pleads his innocence but no one believes him. Desperate, he kidnaps Choudhry's daughter Kajal and bolts.

Cast
Mithun Chakraborty as Inspector Deva Prakash
Raakhee as Mrs. Rai
Jaya Prada as Rani
Atul Agnihotri as Rohit Rai
Mamta Kulkarni as Kajal Choudhry
Shakti Kapoor as Rani's accomplice
Mohan Joshi as Gajraj Choudhry
Alok Nath as Vasudev Rai
Rami Reddy as Madan 
Girja Shankar as Inspector Ajay Kumar

Soundtrack
The music was composed by Nadeem-Shravan and lyrics were written by Sameer.

"Zindagi Ko Guzarne Ke Liye" and the Bengali version "E Jiban Tomar Jonno" was a very popular song that year.

Hindi

Bengali

References

External links
 

Categories:Indian action films 

1997 films
1990s Hindi-language films
Films scored by Nadeem–Shravan
Mithun's Dream Factory films
Films shot in Ooty
Films directed by Partho Ghosh
Indian drama films
Indian action drama films